Aerobic gymnastics at the 2005 Asian Indoor Games was held in Saphan Hin Sports Complex, Phuket, Thailand from 16 November to 17 November 2005.

Medalists

Medal table

Results

Men's individual
17 November

Semifinal

Final

Women's individual
16 November

Semifinal

Final

Mixed pair
16 November

Semifinal

Final

Trio
17 November

Semifinal

Final

References
 2005 Asian Indoor Games official website
 Results

2005 Asian Indoor Games events
Asian Indoor Games
2005